is a Japanese physicist, Professor at University of Tokyo and Director of Center for Emergent Matter Science (CEMS) at RIKEN.

Biography
Tokura was born in Nishiwaki, Hyōgo, Japan. He holds a: B.S. in Applied Physics, the University of Tokyo (1976), and a M.S. (1978) and Ph.D (1981) in that subject from the same university. His subsequent career has also been at the University of Tokyo, rising from  Research Associate to Lecturer in the Dept. of Applied Physics, then Assistant Professor and Professor in the Dept. of Physics, and finally, from 1995 on, Professor in Dept. of Applied Physics.

In addition has been 
 1993 – 2002:	Group Leader, Joint Research Center for Atom Technology (JRCAT)
 2001 – 2008:	Director, Correlated Electron Research Center (CERC), AIST
 2001 – 2007:	Research Director, Tokura Spin Superstructure, ERATO-JST
 2006 – 2012:	Research Director, Tokura Multiferroics Project, ERATO-JST
 2007 – 2013:	Group Director, Cross-Correlated Materials Research Group (CMRG), RIKEN
 2008–present: AIST Fellow, National Institute of Advanced Industrial Science and Technology (AIST)
 2010 – 2013:	Center Director, Quantum-Phase Electronics Center (QPEC), School of Engineering, The University of Tokyo
 2010 – 2013:	Director, Emergent Materials Department, RIKEN Advanced Science Institute
 2010 – 2013:	Group Director, Correlated Electron Research Group (CERG), RIKEN Advanced Science Institute
 2013–Present: Director of Center for Emergent Matter Science (CEMS)

Academy
He is a Member of the Science Council of Japan, and a Foreign Member of the Royal Swedish Academy of Sciences (2014 – )

Recognition
1990: Nishina Memorial Prize
1990: IBM Japan Science Prize
1991: Bernd T. Matthias Prize
1998: Nissan Science Prize
1999: JPS Award for Academic Papers on Physics
2002: Asahi Prize
2002: ISI Citation Laureate Award （Department of Applied Physics）
2003: Medal with Purple Ribbon
2005: James C. McGroddy Prize for New Materials
2011: 52nd Fujihara Award
2012: IUPAP Magnetism Award and Néel Medal
2013: Imperial Prize of the Japan Academy
2014: Honorary Doctor at Uppsala University
2014: 55th Honda Memorial Award
2014: Thomson Reuters Citation Laureates
2020: Person of Cultural Merit
2022: Members of the Japan Academy

References

External links
Tokura Laboratory at University of Tokyo
Center for Emergent Matter Science at RIKEN

1954 births
Living people
Japanese physicists
People from Hyōgo Prefecture
University of Tokyo alumni
Academic staff of the University of Tokyo
Persons of Cultural Merit
Fellows of the American Physical Society
Members of the Japan Academy